Birkhead is a surname. Notable people with the surname include:

Edith Birkhead, lecturer in English Literature at the University of Bristol and a Noble Fellow at the University of Liverpool
George Birkhead (died 1614), English Roman Catholic priest, archpriest in England from 1608
Harry Birkhead (died 2013), South African philatelist
Henry Birkhead (1617–1696), English academic, lawyer and Latin poet
Martin Birkhead (died 1590), English politician
Tim Birkhead, Professor of Zoology at the University of Sheffield and author

See also
Dannielynn Birkhead paternity case, centered on a child born September 7, 2006 to Vickie Lynn Marshall